Don Page may refer to:

 Don Page (physicist) (born 1948), Canadian theoretical physicist
 Don Page (politician) (born 1951), Australian politician
 Don Page (footballer) (born 1964), English former footballer